TOKYO FILMeX (東京フィルメックス) is an international film festival established in 2000. The film festival was launched by Office Kitano, the agency and production company co-founded by leading actor-filmmaker Takeshi Kitano. TOKYO FILMeX  especially focuses on new and independent feature films from Asia. A large number of films selected for competition program come from China, Japan, Korea, Iran, etc.

The festival's main events have been held at Yurakucho, Tokyo in late November annually, consists of the Competition Program, Special screening Program and Filmmakers in focus Program. Alongside the competition program for young emerging Asian filmmakers and other screening programs, stage appearances by actors and symposiums are also planned to discover the masterworks of independent filmmakers from around the world.

In 2018, Office Kitano was restructured after Kitano announced in March that he was quitting to go independent. As representing Kitano brought in a large proportion of Office Kitano’s revenue, the company has now scaled back production and is no longer in a position to fund TOKYO FILMeX. Kinoshita Group has stepped in to take over the management role and part-finance the event, which also receives funding from government and sponsorship deals.

Competition Grand Prize Winners

References

External links

Film festivals in Tokyo
Film festivals established in 2000
2000 establishments in Japan